Armindo Vaz d'Almeida (1953 – July 11, 2016) was the seventh prime minister of São Tomé and Príncipe. He held the post from 30 December 1995 to 19 November 1996. He was a member of the Movement for the Liberation of São Tomé and Príncipe-Social Democratic Party (MLSTP-PSD).

References

1953 births
2016 deaths
Movement for the Liberation of São Tomé and Príncipe/Social Democratic Party politicians
Prime Ministers of São Tomé and Príncipe
20th-century São Tomé and Príncipe politicians